Juana Bignozzi (1937 – 5 August 2015) was an Argentine translator, journalist, and poet. She was a recipient of the 2000 Municipal Poetry Prize, the 2004 Konex Award, and the 2013 Rosa de Cobre Prize.

Biography
Juana Bignozzi was born in 1937 to an anarchist and  family. Though growing up with economic limitations, she always had privileged access to culture and education over other expenses, which Bignozzi greatly appreciated.

In the 1960s she left the Communist Party although she worked on the publication Vanguardia Comunista. She began and abandoned careers in Arts and Law at the University of Buenos Aires. She worked as an accounting professor, accountant, and administrative assistant.

In 1974, she married Hugo Mariani and moved to Barcelona, before the beginning of the National Reorganization Process. She left thinking that she would return in a few years, and for that reason she did not accept the word exiliada (exiled) but accepted the words desterrada, apátrida (exiled, stateless). She spent 30 years of her life in Spain, working as a translator and traveling frequently to Florence.

About poetry, Bignozzi said:

Bignozzi returned to Argentina in 2004, where she died in 2015 at age 78.

Awards
She was awarded the 2000 Municipal Poetry Prize, the 2004 Konex Award, and the 2013 Rosa de Cobre Prize from the National Library of Argentina.

Books
 1960: Los límites
 1962: Tierra de nadie
 1989: Regreso a la patria 
 1990: Mujer de cierto orden 
 1993: Interior con poeta 
 1997: Partida de las grande líneas
 2000: La ley tu ley
 2010: Si alguien tiene que ser después

References

1937 births
2015 deaths
20th-century Argentine poets
21st-century Argentine poets
Argentine communists
Argentine exiles
Argentine translators
Argentine women journalists
Argentine women poets
Journalists from Buenos Aires